Perfect World is the sixth EP from Eiko Shimamiya.

Track listing

2010 albums
Eiko Shimamiya albums
New-age albums by Japanese artists